Alexander Rowe (born 8 July 1992) is an Australian track and field athlete specialising in the 800 meters who has competed in the World Championships.

Records and rankings
Rowe is a one-time gold medalist and a two-time silver medalist in the 800 metres in the Australian National Track & Field Championships. He is also a two-time gold medalist and a one-time silver medalist in the Australian Junior National Track & Field Championships also in the 800 metres. He shares the best Australian time in the 800 meters with Ralph Doubell.

Competitions

Youth World Championships
Rowe has competed in one World Youth Championships (2009). He competed in the 800 meters and made the final and finished 5th in a time of 1:52.13.

Senior World Championships
Rowe was selected  to compete in the 2013 World Championships in Moscow in the 800 meters. He finished 5th in heat six in a time of 1:45.92. His performance qualified him for the semi-final and he competed in semi-final one. He finished 6th and did not qualify him for the final. This was the end of Rowe's competition, however his time of 1:45.80 saw him finish 13th overall in the competition. This was the best result for an Australian in the 800m at a World Championships in its history.

In 2014 Rowe was selected to compete in the Glasgow Commonwealth Games, however he never made it to the track, being forced out with a hamstring strain just days before competition.

Statistics

Personal bests

Progression

Achievements

References

1992 births
Living people
Athletes from Melbourne
Australian male middle-distance runners
World Athletics Championships athletes for Australia